Dolomedes  is a genus of large spiders of the family Pisauridae. They are also known as fishing spiders, raft spiders, dock spiders or wharf spiders. Almost all Dolomedes species are semiaquatic, with the exception of the tree-dwelling D. albineus of the southeastern United States. Many species have a striking pale stripe down each side of the body.

They hunt by waiting at the edge of a pool or stream, then when they detect the ripples from prey, they run across the surface to subdue it using their foremost legs, which are tipped with small claws; like other spiders they then inject venom with their hollow jaws to kill and digest the prey. They mainly eat insects, but some larger species are able to catch small fish. They can also climb beneath the water, when they become encased in a silvery film of air. "Dolomedes" is derived from the Greek word "δολομήδης" which means wily, deceitful.

There are over a hundred species of Dolomedes throughout the world; examples include Dolomedes aquaticus, a forest-stream species of New Zealand, the raft spider (D. fimbriatus), which lives in bogs in Europe, and the great raft spider (D. plantarius), which lives in fens, also in Europe.

Aquatic adaptations
Dolomedes spiders are covered all over in short, velvety hairs which are hydrophobic. This allows them to use surface tension to stand or run on the water, like water striders. They can also climb beneath the water, and then air becomes trapped in the body hairs and forms a thin film over the whole surface of the body and legs, giving them the appearance of fine polished silver. Like other spiders, Dolomedes breathe with book lungs beneath their abdomens, and these open into the air film, allowing the spiders to breathe while submerged. The trapped air makes them very buoyant and even if they do not hold onto a rock or a plant stem they float to the surface where they pop onto the surface film, completely dry.

Identification 
If any of this species are seen without context, one may confuse them with the family Lycosidae, otherwise known as Wolf Spiders. Though one could easily identify them, as this genus owns 2 rows of eyes, with 2 larger eyes at the top, which is unique to this genus inside the Pisauridae family. If this isn't sufficient, one can further differentiate them thanks to their aquatic adaptations.

Hunting behavior 

Rather than hunting on land or by waiting in a web, these spiders hunt on the surface of the water itself, preying on mayflies, other aquatic insects, and even small fish. For fishing spiders, the water surface serves the same function as a web does for other spiders. They extend their legs onto the surface, feeling for vibrations given off by prey.       

Dolomedes are nocturnal hunters, feeding when birds, their main predators, are sleeping. The method they use to fish for insects is to hold on to the shore with their back legs while the rest of their body lies on the water, with legs stretched out. Dolomedes species tend to be robust with thickset legs that allow them to tackle prey larger than themselves. They stretch out their front legs and wait, as if listening. Their front legs feel the vibrations carried on the water, just as other spiders feel the vibrations in a web. They are able to tell what is causing the vibrations that the water is carrying - to distinguish the drawn-out, erratic vibrations of a struggling insect from the one-off vibrations caused by falling leaves or the background noise of the wind or the flow of the water around rocks and other obstacles. As well as identifying the source of the vibrations, the spiders are also able to discern the distance to and direction of the source. To this end they have a range of vibration-detecting organs, including very sensitive hairs (trichobothria) on their legs and feet. Their eyes play a secondary role - experiments on related species show that touch is the main sense these spiders use to catch their prey. Their eyes are of little use for nocturnal hunting. These vibration detectors also serve to warn the spider of predators such as trout.

As soon as the vibrations reveal that there is a floundering insect within range, some fishing spiders may take direct action - they run at pace across the surface of the water and grab the insect before it extracts itself from the water and flies to safety. Some fishing spiders use silk draglines to prevent themselves from speeding past the prey.

Fishing spiders' main prey is aquatic insects, but they are opportunistic feeders and will eat anything suitable that happens within range. Dolomedes in North America have been observed catching and eating small goldfish.

Predators 
The main predators of fishing spiders are birds and snakes. Dragonflies have also been observed catching young spiders. Species parasitic on the spiders include a wasp of the Pompilidae family, commonly called the Spider Wasp, that stings the spider to paralyze it before carrying it off and laying an egg in its abdomen. The larvae of the wasp hatch and proceed to eat the spider from the inside out. One escape technique the spiders use is to disappear beneath the surface tension of the water. However, some wasps, such as Anoplius depressipes, are able to be underwater for a few minutes to sting the spider and drag it out of the water.

Breeding 

The males outnumber the females 3:1 suggesting a male-biased sex ratio. Mating in one North American species (D. tenebrosus) always results in the obligate death of the male, with no obvious involvement from the female.

Species
, the World Spider Catalog accepted the following 101 species:

Dolomedes actaeon Pocock, 1903 – Cameroon
Dolomedes albicomus L. Koch, 1867 – Australia (Queensland, New South Wales)
Dolomedes albicoxus Bertkau, 1880 – Brazil
Dolomedes albineus Hentz, 1845 – USA
Dolomedes alexandri Raven & Hebron, 2018 –  Australia (Capital Territory, Victoria)
Dolomedes angolensis (Roewer, 1955) – Angola
Dolomedes angustivirgatus Kishida, 1936 – China, Korea, Japan
Dolomedes angustus (Thorell, 1899) – Cameroon
Dolomedes annulatus Simon, 1877 – Philippines
Dolomedes aquaticus Goyen, 1888 – New Zealand
Dolomedes batesi Pocock, 1903 – Cameroon
Dolomedes bistylus Roewer, 1955 – Congo
Dolomedes boiei (Doleschall, 1859) – Sri Lanka, Indonesia (Java)
Dolomedes briangreenei Raven & Hebron, 2018 –  Australia (New South Wales, Queensland)
Dolomedes bukhkaloi Marusik, 1988 – Russia
Dolomedes chevronus Yin, 2012 – China
Dolomedes chinesus Chamberlin, 1924 – China
Dolomedes chroesus Strand, 1911 – Indonesia (Aru Is., New Guinea)
Dolomedes costatus Zhang, Zhu & Song, 2004 – China
Dolomedes crosbyi Lessert, 1928 – Congo
Dolomedes dondalei Vink & Dupérré, 2010 – New Zealand
Dolomedes elegans Taczanowski, 1874 – French Guiana
Dolomedes facetus L. Koch, 1876 – Australia, New Guinea, Samoa
Dolomedes fageli Roewer, 1955 – Congo
Dolomedes femoralis Hasselt, 1882 – Indonesia (Sumatra)
Dolomedes fernandensis Simon, 1910 – Equatorial Guinea (Bioko)
Dolomedes fimbriatus (Clerck, 1757) (type species) – Palearctic
Dolomedes flaminius L. Koch, 1867 – Australia (Queensland), New Caledonia
Dolomedes fontus Tanikawa & Miyashita, 2008 – Japan
Dolomedes furcatus Roewer, 1955 – Mozambique
Dolomedes fuscipes Roewer, 1955 – Cameroon
Dolomedes fuscus Franganillo, 1931 – Cuba
Dolomedes gertschi Carico, 1973 – USA
Dolomedes gracilipes Lessert, 1928 – Congo
Dolomedes guamuhaya Alayón, 2003 – Cuba
Dolomedes holti Carico, 1973 – Mexico
Dolomedes horishanus Kishida, 1936 – Taiwan, Japan
Dolomedes instabilis L. Koch, 1876 – Australia, Papua New Guinea
Dolomedes intermedius Giebel, 1863 – Colombia
Dolomedes japonicus Bösenberg & Strand, 1906 – China, Korea, Japan
Dolomedes kalanoro Silva & Griswold, 2013 – Madagascar
Dolomedes karijini Raven & Hebron, 2018 – Australia (Western Australia)
Dolomedes karschi Strand, 1913 – Sri Lanka
Dolomedes lafoensis Berland, 1924 – New Caledonia
Dolomedes laticeps Pocock, 1898 – Solomon Is.
Dolomedes lesserti Roewer, 1955 – Mozambique
Dolomedes lizturnerae Raven & Hebron, 2018 – Australia (Tasmania)
Dolomedes machadoi Roewer, 1955 – West Africa
Dolomedes macrops Simon, 1906 – Sudan
Dolomedes mankorlod Raven & Hebron, 2018 – Australia (Northern Territory)
Dolomedes mendigoetmopasi Barrion, 1995 – Philippines
Dolomedes minahassae Merian, 1911 – Indonesia (Sulawesi)
Dolomedes minor L. Koch, 1876 – New Zealand
Dolomedes mizhoanus Kishida, 1936 – China, Laos, Malaysia, Taiwan
Dolomedes naja Berland, 1938 – Vanuatu
Dolomedes neocaledonicus Berland, 1924 – New Caledonia
Dolomedes nigrimaculatus Song & Chen, 1991 – China, Korea
Dolomedes noukhaiva Walckenaer, 1847 – Marquesas Is.
Dolomedes ohsuditia Kishida, 1936 – Japan
Dolomedes okefinokensis Bishop, 1924 – USA
Dolomedes orion Tanikawa, 2003 – Japan
Dolomedes palmatus Zhang, Zhu & Song, 2005 – China
Dolomedes palpiger Pocock, 1903 – Cameroon
Dolomedes paroculus Simon, 1901 – Malaysia
Dolomedes pedder Raven & Hebron, 2018 –  Australia (Tasmania)
Dolomedes pegasus Tanikawa, 2012 – Japan
Dolomedes petalinus Yin, 2012 – China
Dolomedes plantarius (Clerck, 1757) – Europe, Russia (Europe to South Siberia), Kazakhstan
Dolomedes pullatus Nicolet, 1849 – Chile
Dolomedes raptor Bösenberg & Strand, 1906 – Russia, China, Korea, Japan
Dolomedes raptoroides Zhang, Zhu & Song, 2004 – China
Dolomedes saganus Bösenberg & Strand, 1906 – China, Taiwan, Japan
Dolomedes schauinslandi Simon, 1899 – New Zealand
Dolomedes scriptus Hentz, 1845 – USA, Canada
Dolomedes senilis Simon, 1880 – Russia, China, Japan
Dolomedes signatus Walckenaer, 1837 – Mariana Is.
Dolomedes silvicola Tanikawa & Miyashita, 2008 – China, Japan
Dolomedes smithi Lessert, 1916 – East Africa
Dolomedes spathularis Hasselt, 1882 – Indonesia (Sumatra)
Dolomedes stilatus Karsch, 1878 – Australia
Dolomedes straeleni Roewer, 1955 – Congo
Dolomedes striatus Giebel, 1869 – USA, Canada
Dolomedes sulfureus L. Koch, 1878 – Russia, China, Korea, Japan
Dolomedes sumatranus Strand, 1906 – Indonesia (Sumatra)
Dolomedes tadzhikistanicus Andreeva, 1976 – Tajikistan
Dolomedes tenebrosus Hentz, 1844 – USA, Canada
Dolomedes titan Berland, 1924 – New Caledonia, Vanuatu
Dolomedes toldo Alayón, 2003 – Cuba
Dolomedes transfuga Pocock, 1900 – Congo
Dolomedes triton (Walckenaer, 1837) – North America, Cuba
Dolomedes upembensis (Roewer, 1955) – Congo
Dolomedes vatovae Caporiacco, 1940 – Ethiopia
Dolomedes venmani Raven & Hebron, 2018 – Australia (New South Wales, Queensland)
Dolomedes vicque Raven & Hebron, 2018 – Australia (Victoria, New South Wales, Queensland)
Dolomedes vittatus Walckenaer, 1837 – USA
Dolomedes wetarius Strand, 1911 – Indonesia
Dolomedes wollastoni Hogg, 1915 – New Guinea
Dolomedes wollemi Raven & Hebron, 2018 – Australia (New South Wales)
Dolomedes yawatai Ono, 2002 – Japan (Ryukyu Is.)
Dolomedes zatsun Tanikawa, 2003 – Japan
Dolomedes zhangjiajiensis Yin, 2012 – China

Distribution
The approximately 100 species of Dolomedes have a worldwide distribution. The largest number of species are found in Asia, with particularly high species diversity in South-east Asia, from China and Japan to New Guinea. The second largest number of species occur in tropical Africa. South America has only four species.

North America

Nine species of Dolomedes exist in North America. The six-spotted fishing spider (D. triton) lives primarily in small lakes and ponds. This spider consumes mostly water striders (pond skaters), but like all Dolomedes, it is an opportunistic ambush hunter that will eat anything that it can capture.  Other species include the bog-dwelling D. striatus, and four species living by streams: D. scriptus, D. vittatus, D. gertschi and D. holti. Two North American species, D. tenebrosus and D. okefinokensis, exhibit female giganticism and/or male dwarfism, with their males being less than half the size of the females. The ninth species is the arboreal D. albineus.

Europe
Two Dolomedes species occur in Europe (excluding Russia). The Palearctic raft spider (D. fimbriatus) is widespread on the surface of bog pools and in boggy grassland. The great raft spider (D. plantarius) lives in fens, and is listed as endangered in Great Britain and is globally vulnerable.

New Zealand

Four endemic species of Dolomedes occur in New Zealand, three on the mainland and one on the Chatham Islands. Two are widespread: D. aquaticus of open riverbanks and lakeshores, and D. dondalei or New Zealand forest fishing spider (once referred to as Dolomedes III), which specialises in forested riverbanks. The largest New Zealand species, D. schauinslandi or the Rangatira spider, occurs on rodent-free islands in the Chathams where running water is rare. The fourth and most common species, D. minor, is found in scrubland, grassland, and wetlands. It mostly hunts on the ground, but is still capable of catching aquatic prey. Known as the nursery web spider, it makes white nursery webs on shrubs.

References

Further reading
Carico, James Edwin (1973): The Nearctic spiders of the genus Dolomedes (Araneae: Pisauridae). Bulletin of the Museum of Comparative Zoology (Harvard) 144 (7): 435-488.

External links

Fishing spider Dolomedes tenebrosus
(free for noncommercial use) 
 Pictures of Dolomedes triton
Jeffrey K. Barnes, Dark fishing spider, Arthropod Museum Notes, University of Arkansas.
Richard Ford, The raft spider (Dolomedes fimbriatus), Digitalwildlife.co.uk. image and short description

 
Araneomorphae genera
Cosmopolitan spiders